Samangan (also Romanized as Samangān; also known as Robāţ-e Samangān, Ribāt-i-Samangan, and Robāt-e Samgān) is a village in Karizan Rural District, Nasrabad District, Torbat-e Jam County, Razavi Khorasan Province, Iran. At the 2006 census, its population was 5,173, in 1,136 families.

References 

Populated places in Torbat-e Jam County